Gustavo Filipe Alves Freitas Azevedo Sá (born 11 November 2004) is a Portuguese professional footballer who plays as a right-back for the Primeira Liga club Famalicão.

Club career
Sá is a youth product of Academia Elite Sport, Porto and Famalicão. On 19 October 2019, he was promoted to Famalicão's U19 squad at the age of 16 and signed a professional contract until 2024. On 3 June 2025, he started training with the first team and had his contract extended until 2025. He made his professional and senior debut with Famalicão as a late substitute in a 3–0 Primeira Liga loss to Braga on 12 August 2022.

International career
Sá is a youth international for Portugal, having been called up to the Portugal U19s.

References

External links
 
 

2004 births
Living people
People from Póvoa de Varzim
Portuguese footballers
Portugal youth international footballers
Association football midfielders
F.C. Famalicão players
Primeira Liga players